Reality hacker, reality cracker or reality coder may refer to:

 Reality hacking, any phenomenon that emerges from the nonviolent use of illegal or legally ambiguous digital tools in pursuit of politically, socially, or culturally subversive ends.
 Reality Hacker, a character class in the game Realmwalkers: Earth Light by Mind's Eye Publishing.
 Reality Hackers, an earlier name for Mondo 2000 magazine.
 Reality Coders, a faction of the Virtual Adepts, a secret society of mages whose magick revolves around digital technology, in the  Mage: The Ascension role-playing game.

See also
Life hack
Urban Exploration
Hacktivism
Pervasive game